Arne Tollbom (20 March 1911 – 16 November 1971) was a Swedish fencer. He won a bronze medal in the team épée event at the 1948 Summer Olympics.

References

External links
 

1911 births
1971 deaths
Swedish male épée fencers
Olympic fencers of Sweden
Fencers at the 1948 Summer Olympics
Olympic bronze medalists for Sweden
Olympic medalists in fencing
Sportspeople from Helsinki
Medalists at the 1948 Summer Olympics
20th-century Swedish people